Sinfónico (Symphonic) (1999) is the sixteenth album and fourth live album by Mexican rock and blues band El Tri. The recording was the first with an orchestra as a celebration of the 30 years of the band.

The album received a gold certification in Mexico.

Track listing 

 "Virgen Morena" (Brown-Skinned Virgin) – 8:31 (Cuando Tú No Estás, 1997)
 "Mente Roquera" (Rocker Mindset) – 5:46 (La Devaluación, 1975)
 "Maria Sabina" – 5:41 (21 Años Después, Alex Lora y El Tri, 1989)
 "Los Minusválidos" (The Handicapped) (Chicho Mora, Lora, Martinez, Rafael Salgado, Ruben Soriano, Felipe Souza) – 4:03 (Una Rola Para los Minusvalidos, 1994)
 "Las Piedras Rodantes" (The Rolling Stones) – 3:20 (Una Rola Para los Minusvalidos, 1994)
 "El Niño Sin Amor" (The Child Without Love) – 3:52 (El Niño Sin Amor, 1986)
 "Difícil" (Difficult) (Lora, Horacio Reni) – 3:34 (21 Años Después, Alex Lora y El Tri, 1989)
 "Cuando Tú No Estás" (When You Aren't Here) – 5:06 (Cuando Tú No Estás, 1997)
 "Nostalgia" – 6:01 (Fin de Siglo, 1998)
 "Triste Canción" (Sad Song) - 9:21 (Simplemente, 1984)
 "Pobre Soñador" (Poor Dreamer) (Lora, Souza) – 6:49 (25 Años, 1993)
 "A.D.O." – 9:27 (Es lo Mejor, 1974)

Personnel 

 Alex Lora – guitar, bass, vocals, producer, mixing
 Rafael Salgado – harmonic
 Eduardo Chico – guitar
 Oscar Zarate – guitar
 Chela Lora – backing vocals, planning, coordination
 Ramon Perez – drums

Guest musicians 

 Lalo Toral – piano
 Felipe Souza – guitar
Zbigniew Paleta – violin

Orchestra 

Eduardo Diazmuñoz – director
violin – Toribio Amaro, Dinu Bilciurescu, Flavie Boeda, Concertino, Camilo Hernandez Cortez, Adriana Galfi, Teodoro Galvez, Mario Góngora, Serguei Gorbenko, Janina Herman, Pedro Hernandez, Viktoria Horti, Iouri Kulikov, Beata Kurkawska, Ulises Aguirre Lazcano, José Juan Melo, Martha Olvera, Roberto Pansera, Carlos Rosas, Konstantine Saksonskiy, Luis Meza Sanchez, Vera Silantieva
viola – Tomas Albendea, Paul Abbot, Chingiz Mamedov, Rousell Montanez, Emigdio Espinoza Saandoval, Gerardo Sánchez Vizcaino, Isabel Sosa, Milana Soboleva,
cello – Jorge Amador Bedolla, Loudmilla Beglarian, Carlos Casteneda, Luz Maria Frenk, Jacek Gebezynski, Iván Nemech Granchak, Rebeca Mata Sandoval
bass fiddle – David Bretón, Victor Hugo Floes Herrera, Nicolo Popov, Marco Antonio Quiñones, Joel Trejo
flute – Rafael Urrusti, Ricardo
piccolo – Medina Femat
oboe – Eddie Spencer, Kioko Nerike
English horn – Nerike
clarinet – Austreberto Mendez, Martin Arnold
bass clarinet – Arnold
saxophone – Baltazar Chavarría
bassoon – David Ball, Gerardo Ledezma
horn – Javier Leon Machorro, Allison McKee, Carlos Torres, Elizabeth Rising
trumpet – Ricardo Kirgan, Jaime Mendez, William Neal Woolworth
trombone – Julio Briseño, Gustavo Rosales
bass trombone – Gabriel Pérez
tuba – Paul Conrad
cymbals – Abel Benítez Torres
percussion – Armando Zerquera Balbuena, Armando Zerquera
Harp – Gounta Salaks

Technical personnel 

Amir Gay – A&R
Maricela Valencia – coordination
 Fernando Aceves – photography
Jose Argil – engineer
Rodrigo Argil – engineer
Laura Cardenas – art direction
Mark Chalecki – mastering
Jan Carlo DeFan – production assistant
Raul Durand – technical assistance
Pablo Esposito – assistant engineer
Marco Gamboa – mixing assistant
Gil Garcia – technical assistance
Rito Hernandez – assistant engineer
Victor Moran Lopez – orchestra coordination
Miguel Martinez – assistant director, mixing assistant
Sylvia Meza – art direction
Francisco Miranda – engineer
Arnulfo Montes – technical assistance
Carlos Montaño – technical support
Juan Carlos Paz Y Puente – executive producer
José Luis Pichardo – technical assistance
Fernando Roldán – engineer
Jean Smit – engineer
Humberto Terán – engineer
Salvador Tercero – director, engineer, recording director

References

External links 
www.eltri.com.mx
Sinfónico at MusicBrainz
[ Sinfónico] at Allmusic

El Tri albums
1999 live albums
Warner Music Group live albums